Extended Play is an EP by British-American rock band Fleetwood Mac, released in 2013. Released as a digital download by the band themselves and without a record company, it was the band's first new music in ten years since their 2003 album Say You Will and the last release of studio material to feature Lindsey Buckingham before his removal from the band in 2018.

Background
While the EP was only available digitally without any promotion and no physical CD version was ever released, "Extended Play" still reached No. 48 on the Billboard 200 albums chart and sold 9,000 copies in its first week. However, the next week, it left the chart entirely. It also charted at No. 14 on the Top Digital Albums chart, No. 9 on the Top Independent Albums chart, and No. 13 on the Top Rock Albums chart. "Without You" was a "lost" demo written during the Buckingham Nicks era, which Nicks herself had found posted on YouTube.

"Sad Angel" and "Without You" were performed on their 2013 tour.

Track listing

Personnel
Lindsey Buckingham – guitars, keyboards, piano, bass guitar, percussion, synthesizer strings, drum programming, vocals
Stevie Nicks – vocals
John McVie – bass guitar
Mick Fleetwood – drums, percussion

References

2013 debut EPs
Fleetwood Mac EPs
Self-released EPs
Albums produced by Mitchell Froom
Albums produced by Lindsey Buckingham